Grillenburg may refer to:
 Grillenburg (Tharandt), a village in the municipality of Hartha in the borough of Tharandt, Sächsische Schweiz-Osterzgebirge district, Saxony
 Grillenburg Hunting Lodge in the Tharandt Forest, Sächsische Schweiz-Osterzgebirge district, Saxony
 Grillenburg Triangle, the motorcycle track of the 1st Sachsenring, in the Tharandt Forest, Sächsische Schweiz-Osterzgebirge district, Saxony
 Grillenburg Sandstone, the Elbe sandstone type in the Tharandt Forest, Sächsische Schweiz-Osterzgebirge district, Saxony
 Grillenburg (Harz), a ruined castle above Grillenberg in the Harz Mountains, Mansfeld-Südharz district, Saxony-Anhalt